Torhild, also written Thorhild, Thorild Torild, is a Norwegian feminine given name. Notable persons with that name include:

Torhild Aarbergsbotten (born 1969), Norwegian politician
Torhild Johnsen (born 1934), Norwegian politician
Thorild Olsson (1886–1934), Swedish runner 
Torild Skard (born 1936), Norwegian psychologist
Torild Skogsholm (born 1959), Norwegian politician
Torhild Staahlen (born 1947), Norwegian opera singer
Torild Wardenær (born 1951), Norwegian poet and playwright
Thorild Wulff (1877–1917), Swedish botanist and polar explorer

See also
 Tor (given name)
 Hild (disambiguation)
Torill, a related name

Norwegian feminine given names